A cautionary tale is a story where a person ignores a warning and commits a dangerous or forbidden act, which leads to an unpleasant outcome.

Cautionary Tale or Cautionary Tales may also refer to:

In print
Cautionary Tales, modern edition title of Cautionary Tales for Children, a 1907 children's book written by Belloc
Cautionary Tales, autobiographical stories by Stephen Tobolowsky
Knuffle Bunny: A Cautionary Tale, a 2004 children's picture book by Mo Willems
"Cautionary Tales", a story by Larry Niven from Playgrounds of the Mind (1991)

Film and TV
 "Cautionary Tales" (Heroes), an episode of the TV series Heroes
 Bad Blood: A Cautionary Tale, a 2010 documentary
 Cautionary Tales, a podcast by English economist Tim Harford

Music
Cautionary Tales (album), a 2014 album by Harmony James
Cautionary Tales, an album by Christopher Rees
Cautionary Tales, a 2009 box set from Shadowland
"A Cautionary Tale", a song on the album History of a Time to Come by Sabbat

See also
Cautionary Tales and Other Verses, a 1997 book by Posy Simmonds